Citation Boulevard, a four-lane divided highway, currently extends from just west of US 25 (Georgetown Road) at the Norfolk Southern Railway to KY 922 (Newtown Pike) in Lexington, Kentucky. Known as Phase I, it was completed in 2001 and included a bridge over Cane Run. Phase II extends southwest from the Norfolk Southern Railway to US 421 (Leestown Road) at Alexandria Drive and includes a span over the railroad. The highway west of Newtown Pike was constructed by the Kentucky Transportation Cabinet.

An extension east of KY 922 (Newtown Pike) was not originally planned. However, Newtown Springs, a new development project taking place east of KY 922 and the eastern terminus of Citation Boulevard, incorporated an extension of the route east towards KY 353 (Russell Cave Road). It is being constructed as a two-lane road with curbs and sidewalks.

Citation Boulevard was originally named Secretariat Boulevard after Secretariat, a famous race horse. The owner, however, disapproved the title, so Citation was chosen out of a draw at the Kentucky Horse Park. Citation, a bay colt bred at the Calumet Farm, won the 1948 Triple Crown and raced for seven years and was also the first horse to earn $1 million.

Citation Boulevard Extension

Completed in September 2015, Citation Boulevard was extended from Jaggie Fox Way to Leestown Rd., connecting with a rerouted Alexandria Drive. Days after the opening of Citation Boulevard, there were multiple wrecks at the Greendale intersection. It was criticized that drivers crossing or turning left off of Citation, turning left going northbound or turning right going southbound could not see other drivers coming over the railroad overpass. In less than two days the KYTC released a statement that a traffic light would be installed at that intersection.

Major intersections

See also
 Roads of Lexington, Kentucky

References

External links
 Official website of Lexington Area Metropolitan Planning Organization
 Official website of Kentucky Transportation Cabinet
 

Transportation in Lexington, Kentucky
Streets in Lexington, Kentucky
Roads in Kentucky